Talkhab-e Sofla Bidak (also Romanized as Talkhāb-e Soflá Bīdak; also known as Talkhāb-e Soflásādāt-e Bīdak) is a village in Kuh Mareh Khami Rural District, in the Central District of Basht County, Kohgiluyeh and Boyer-Ahmad Province, Iran. At the 2006 census, its population was 198, in 42 families.

References 

Populated places in Basht County